Forsman is a surname of Scandinavian origin.

Geographical distribution
As of 2014, 41.0% of all known bearers of the surname Forsman were residents of Sweden (frequency 1:2,498), 29.0% of the United States (1:129,388), 22.4% of Finland (1:2,548) and 1.9% of New Zealand (1:25,153).

In Sweden, the frequency of the surname was higher than national average (1:2,498) in the following counties:
 1. Västerbotten (1:606)
 2. Västernorrland (1:1,124)
 3. Dalarna (1:1,260)
 4. Norrbotten (1:1,327)
 5. Gävleborg (1:1,556)
 6. Västmanland (1:1,695)
 7. Jämtland (1:2,069)
 8. Uppsala (1:2,070)
 9. Örebro (1:2,264)

In Finland, the frequency of the surname was higher than national average (1:2,548) in the following regions:
 1. Ostrobothnia (1:547)
 2. Åland (1:1,794)
 3. Uusimaa (1:1,919)
 4. Tavastia Proper (1:2,014)
 5. Southwest Finland (1:2,030)
 6. Satakunta (1:2,134)
 7. Kymenlaakso (1:2,136)

People
 Aarne Forsman, (1884-1921), Finnish photographer
Andrew Forsman, American drummer 
 Andrew Forsman, New Zealand racehorse trainer
Dan Forsman, American professional golfer 
Dick Forsman, Finnish ornithologist 
Eric Forsman, American ornithologist  
Ina Forsman (born 1994), Finnish blues and blues rock singer-songwriter
Ingela Forsman, Swedish lyricist in popular music  
Jaakko Forsman, (1839–1899) Finnish jurist and politician 
Petri Forsman, Finnish orienteering competitor  
Sairi Forsman, Mexican sculptor of Danish descent

References

Surnames
Swedish-language surnames